Łukasz Kubot and Oliver Marach chose to not defend their last year's title.
Rik de Voest and Lu Yen-hsun defeated Sanchai Ratiwatana and Sonchat Ratiwatana 7–6(5), 3–6, [10–6] in the final.

Seeds

Draw

Draw

References
 Doubles Draw
 Qualifying Doubles Draw

Samsung Securities Cup - Doubles
2009 Doubles